Sir William Johnstone Ritchie (October 28, 1813 – September 25, 1892) was one of the first judges appointed to the Supreme Court of Canada. He became the second Chief Justice of the court, and the second-longest serving Chief Justice to date.

Life and career 
Ritchie was born in Annapolis Royal, Nova Scotia to Thomas Ritchie and Elizabeth Wildman Johnstone. He graduated from the Pictou Academy and went to study law in Halifax in the office of his brother, John William Ritchie. He was called to the bar of Nova Scotia in 1837 but moved to Saint John, New Brunswick, and was called to the bar of that province the following year.

In 1846 he was elected to the Legislative Assembly of New Brunswick. In keeping with his pledge to resign if a fellow Liberal candidate failed to win a by-election, he gave up his seat in 1851, only to be re-elected three years later. In 1855 he left politics to accept an appointment to the Supreme Court of New Brunswick, and 10 years later he was named Chief Justice of New Brunswick. He was appointed to the newly established Supreme Court of Canada on September 30, 1875 and became its chief justice on January 11, 1879. He served on the Supreme Court for 17 years until he died on September 25, 1892.

Ritchie was twice married.  He was first married at Rothesay on September 21, 1843 to Martha Strang.  She was the daughter of John Strang, a shipping merchant from St. Andrews. Martha Ritchie died in 1847. A son and a daughter were born to this marriage. Ritchie's second marriage was at Saint John, New Brunswick on May 5, 1856 to Grace Vernon Nicholson (1838–1911). She was the daughter of the late Captain Thomas L. Nicholson and his wife Amy (née Vernon) and stepdaughter of Vice-Admiral William Fitzwilliam Owen, R.N. Seven sons and five daughters were born to this marriage.

Sir William and Lady Ritchie are buried in Beechwood Cemetery, Ottawa.

Ritchie's great-nephew, Roland Ritchie, served as a puisne justice of the Supreme Court.

References

External links 
 Supreme Court of Canada Biography

1813 births
1892 deaths
Canadian Anglicans
Canadian Knights Bachelor
Chief justices of Canada
Justices of the Supreme Court of Canada
New Brunswick Liberal Association MLAs
Colony of New Brunswick judges
Burials at Beechwood Cemetery (Ottawa)